Crowville is an unincorporated community in Franklin Parish, Louisiana, United States. Although unincorporated, Crowville has a post office with a ZIP code of 71230.

History
It was named for T. J. Crow, an early settler and storekeeper.

References

Unincorporated communities in Franklin Parish, Louisiana
Unincorporated communities in Louisiana